The Municipality of Loška Dolina is a municipality in Slovenia. It is part of the Inner Carniola traditional region. Snežnik Castle and Cross Cave are located in the municipality. Its municipal seat is the town of Stari Trg pri Ložu.

Settlements
In addition to the municipal seat of Stari Trg pri Ložu, the municipality also includes the following settlements:

 Babna Polica
 Babno Polje
 Dane
 Dolenje Poljane
 Iga Vas
 Klance
 Knežja Njiva
 Kozarišče
 Lož
 Markovec
 Nadlesk
 Podcerkev
 Podgora pri Ložu
 Podlož
 Pudob
 Šmarata
 Sveta Ana pri Ložu
 Viševek
 Vrh
 Vrhnika pri Ložu

References

External links

Municipality of Loška Dolina on Geopedia
Loška Dolina municipal site

 
Loska Dolina
1994 establishments in Slovenia